Charles Nathan Abi, born on April 12, 2000, is a French footballer who plays currently for AS Saint-Étienne in Ligue 2 as a forward. After making his professional debut for the club in 2018, he has been making a name for himself in the French football scene since then.

Club career

On April 25, 2018, Abi signed his first professional contract with AS Saint-Étienne, beginning a journey that would eventually lead to the start of his professional career. The first of Abi's professional accomplishments came on December 16, 2018, when he made his debut for AS Saint-Étienne in a 1-1 Ligue 1 tie with Nice.  

On 18 January 2021, he scored his first team goal in an away tie in the Coupe de France at Paris FC. On 31 August 2021, Abi signed a loan agreement with Guingamp FC for the duration of the 2021-22 season, effectively transferring to the club on a temporary basis.  

Charles Abi will not appear in Ligue 2 with Saint-Etienne this season before 1 year and a half from the end of his contract. The French attacker is set to undergo a medical examination on Thursday 03 February 2023 with Stade Lausanne Ouchy, which currently occupies third place in the Swiss second division.

Personal life
Abi was born in France, but he has Togolese roots, coming from Togo, a country in West Africa. He is considered a youth international for France.

Honours 
Saint-Étienne

 Coupe de France runner-up: 2019–20

References

External links

2000 births
Sportspeople from Clermont-Ferrand
French sportspeople of Togolese descent
Living people
French footballers
France youth international footballers
Association football forwards
Clermont Foot players
AS Saint-Étienne players
En Avant Guingamp players
Ligue 1 players
Ligue 2 players
Championnat National 2 players
Championnat National 3 players
Black French sportspeople
Footballers from Auvergne-Rhône-Alpes